On Tuesday, May 18, 2004, Randy Johnson, pitching for the Major League Baseball (MLB) Arizona Diamondbacks, threw a perfect game, beating the Atlanta Braves 2–0 at Turner Field in Atlanta before a crowd of 23,381. Johnson, at 40 years, was the oldest pitcher in MLB history to throw a perfect game, surpassing Cy Young who was 37 when he threw his perfect game in 1904. This was baseball's 17th perfect game, with David Cone's perfect game having been the 16th in 1999. Johnson's perfect game was the seventh in National League history (the predecessor being Dennis Martínez in 1991) and the first ever Diamondbacks' no-hitter.

Background

Going into the game, Johnson had a win–loss record of 3–4 with a 2.83 earned run average (ERA) in eight games during the 2004 season. On April 16, 2004, Johnson pitched a complete game shutout against the San Diego Padres.

Game summary
The game started at 7:36 p.m. EDT in front of 23,381 fans at Turner Field in Atlanta. The game was televised nationally by TBS as part of the Braves' TV contract and on FSN Arizona in the Diamondbacks' local market. Johnson's catcher for the game was Robby Hammock, who was playing his second season in the Majors. Johnson later praised Hammock stating, "I only shook [Hammock] off two or three times...He called a great game. The thing is he was probably the most excited guy in the clubhouse, and I'm happy for that. He's come a long way." The last batter of the game was pinch-hitter Eddie Pérez, who struck out on a  fastball. Johnson struck out 13 batters, the third-most strikeouts in an MLB perfect game behind Sandy Koufax's 14 strikeouts in 1965 and Matt Cain's 14 strikeouts in 2012. The perfect game was Johnson's second no-hitter. His first was in 1990 for the Seattle Mariners. Johnson's perfect game was the first in the MLB since David Cone on July 18, 1999 for the New York Yankees, and the first in the National League since Dennis Martínez of the Montreal Expos on July 28, 1991. Johnson, who was 40 at the time, surpassed Cy Young as the oldest pitcher to throw a perfect game in MLB history. Young, who achieved the feat in 1904, was 37 at the time.

The play that came closest to being a hit was Mike Hampton's second at-bat in the sixth inning when a chop ground ball dribbling left of the second base bag resulted in Alex Cintrón performing a do-or-die running grab and throw to first baseman Shea Hillenbrand for the out.

Game statistics
General reference May 18, 2004 Arizona Diamondbacks at Atlanta Braves Play by Play and Box Score Baseball-Reference.com Sports Reference, LLC. Retrieved August 4, 2010.

Line score

Box score

BATTING
2B: Cintron 2 (9, Hampton, Hampton).
TB: Tracy 2; Hillenbrand; Finley; Bautista; Cintron 5.
RBI: Cintron (11), Tracy (15).
2-out RBI: Cintron, Tracy.
Runners left in scoring position, 2 out: Hammock, Hillenbrand, Bautista, Kata 2.
GIDP: Gonzalez, L.
Team LOB: 9.

FIELDING
E: DeRosa (8, fielding), Estrada (1, drop ball), Hampton (1, throw).
Outfield assists: Jones, A (Hammock at 3rd base).
DP: (Hampton-Garcia-Franco).

Other info
Pitches-strikes: Johnson 117–87, Hampton 107–71.
Ground outs-fly outs: Johnson 7–7, Hampton 13–8.
Batters faced: Johnson 27, Hampton 38.
Umpires: HP: Greg Gibson. 1B: Bruce Dreckman. 2B: Gerry Davis. 3B: Larry Poncino.
Weather: 72 °F (22.2 °C), cloudy.
Wind: 5 mph, Out to CF.
Time: 2:13.
Attendance: 23,381.
Venue: Turner Field.

Reactions
Robby Hammock, the catcher of Johnson's perfect game:

Robin Yount, the bench coach of the Diamondbacks:

Luis Gonzalez, left fielder for the Diamondbacks:

Bob Brenly, Diamondbacks manager:

Footnotes
 Eddie Pérez pinch hit for pitcher Mike Hampton in the bottom of the ninth inning.

References

External links
 Randy Johnson's Perfect Game — MLB.com: History
 Full game on YouTube, courtesy of MLB Vault, an official MLB account

2004 Major League Baseball season
Johnson, Randy
Arizona Diamondbacks
Atlanta Braves
May 2004 sports events in the United States
2004 in sports in Georgia (U.S. state)
2004 in Atlanta
Baseball competitions in Atlanta